I'll Be Next Door for Christmas is a 2018 American comedy film directed by David Jay Willis and starring Nicole Sullivan, Atticus Shaffer, Jonathan Mangum, Beth Littleford, Regan Burns and Lil Bub in her final film role. The movie was released worldwide on Amazon Prime and iTunes.

It is the very first feature length film in the United States to successfully use Equity Crowdfunding to raise its budget, with 893 investors.

Premise
I'll Be Next Door for Christmas is a story of a sixteen-year-old girl Nicky who lives in Santa Clarita, California with her family who are crazy for the Christmas holidays. Her family's very over-the-top Christmas celebrations have made her life miserable. At a special summer camp for musicians and actors, Nicky meets the boy of her dreams, Tanner (Bolanos). Tanner decides to visit her from Connecticut, along with his father, for the Christmas holidays. But Nicky doesn't want to get her family in front of Tanner, so she hires actors to play her parents and arranges a fake Christmas dinner in the empty house next door.

Cast
Nicole Sullivan as Ms. James
Atticus Shaffer as Archie
Jonathan Mangum as Bradley
Beth Littleford as Fran
Regan Burns as Chris
Lil Bub as Parsley the Cat
Javier Bolanos as Tanner
Juliette Angelo as Nicky
Kirrilee Berger as Stephanie
Susan Chuang as Patty
Carmine Caridi as Ancient Man
Eve Brenner as Gramma
Gonzalo Martin	as Jason
London Fuller as Noelle
Hannah McCloud	13-Year-Old Nicky

Reception
Common Sense Media gave the film 3 stars out of 5.

References

External links
 

American Christmas comedy films
2018 films
2010s English-language films
2010s American films
2010s Christmas comedy films